The Clark Sisters are an American gospel vocal group consisting of five sisters: Jacky Clark Chisholm (born 1948), Denise "Niecy" Clark-Bradford (born 1953), Elbernita "Twinkie" Clark (born 1954), Dorinda Clark-Cole (born 1957), and Karen Clark Sheard (born 1960). The Clark Sisters are the daughters of gospel musician and choral director Dr. Mattie Moss Clark. They are credited for helping to bring gospel music to the mainstream and are considered pioneers of contemporary gospel. 

Their biggest hits include "Is My Living in Vain", "Praise the Lord (Hallelujah)", "I Can Do All Things Through Christ That Strengthens Me", "A Praying Spirit", "Nothing to Lose, All to Gain", "Endow Me", "Jesus Is a Love Song", "Ha-Ya (Eternal Life)", "Pure Gold", "Expect Your Miracle", and their biggest, mainstream crossover hit, "You Brought the Sunshine". 

As a group, the Clark Sisters have won three Grammy Awards and are the highest-selling female gospel group in history. In 2020, it was announced that the Clark Sisters would be honored with the James Cleveland Lifetime Achievement Award at the 35th Annual Stellar Awards. In 2022, the group was inducted into the Black Music & Entertainment Walk of Fame.

History

Early years
The Clark Sisters were born and raised in Detroit, Michigan, to gospel choir director and musician Dr. Mattie Moss Clark. Dr. Clark was married twice: her first marriage in 1945 to Leo H. Cullum, Sr. produced two children, Leo, Jr. and Jacqueline (Jacky). After her divorce, she met and later married Pastor Elbert Clark in 1952. This marriage produced four daughters: Denise, Elbernita (Twinkie), Dorinda, and Karen. They each began singing at an early age in the choir at their father's Church of God in Christ, and by the late 1960s they were all performing together in church services, usually singing songs written and arranged by their mother. Shortly after the Clarks' divorce in 1973, Dr. Clark formally created "the Clark Sisters" and the sisters recorded their first album, Jesus Has a Lot to Give, on their uncle (their mother's younger brother) Bill Moss' local label Billesse Records. The first television appearance of the Clark Sisters was on TV Gospel Time. 

The following year, Dr. Mattie Moss Clark Presents the Clark Sisters was released and people around Detroit began to take notice of the group. The Clark Sisters signed to Sound of Gospel Records in 1974. Under this association, the group released albums such as Unworthy, Count It All Joy, and He Gave Me Nothing to Lose, which hit the top 20 of the Billboard Spiritual LPs chart. By this point, Dr. Clark had turned over control of the group to Twinkie, who continued to write, arrange, conduct, and produce all of the Clark Sisters' recordings. Their popularity soared with the release of the live recording Is My Living in Vain, in 1980. Their debut live recording was first ranked on the 1981 Billboard Spiritual Albums year-end chart at number 21, before topping the year-end Spiritual Albums chart of 1982. Opening with the bluesy title track, each sister vocally declares that their dedication to Christ is not a useless effort. The innovative "Ha-Ya (Eternal Life)" was funky enough to find its way into a Tonex-produced track over two decades later. Karen Clark's lead on "Speak Lord" expresses deep faith while the call to worship is raised on "Now Is the Time". Another hit from this release, "Expect Your Miracle", is still a staple in African American churches across the country.

Mainstream success (1981-1984)
Their next release, You Brought the Sunshine (1981), became successful due to its title track. Reminiscent of Stevie Wonder's "Master Blaster (Jammin')", the song became a hit in churches and on dance floors across the country, including New York's Studio 54. "You Brought the Sunshine (Into My Life)" was picked up from its original independent gospel record label Sound of Gospel and distributed by both Westbound Records and Elektra Records. In 1983, the song peaked at number 16 on Billboard Black Singles, number 27 on Dance Club Songs and in 2020 – the Live: One Last Time (2007) recording – hit number 11 on the Hot Gospel Songs chart. The album was also a commercial success, peaking at number nine on the US Top Gospel Albums chart and also appeared on both the 1983 and 1984 year-end charts at number two and 25 respectively. Furthermore, Billboard ranked The Clark Sisters as the number-four Top Gospel Albums Artist of 1982 and number-one Top Gospel Albums Artist of 1983.

The sisters delivered another album in 1982, Sincerely, which included "Name It, Claim It" and the politically charged "World". Though its success was overshadowed by You Brought the Sunshine, the sisters received their first Grammy Award nomination for Best Soul Gospel Performance by a Duo or Group for the album at the 26th Annual Grammy Awards. Shortly after winning the Grammy nomination, the Clark Sisters won the NAACP Image Award for best gospel group for 1983. After receiving a second Grammy nomination in the Best Soul Gospel Performance by a Duo or Group category for the song, "He'll Turn Your Scars into Stars" – later included on the album Heart & Soul (1986) – the sisters were invited to perform live on the following 27th Annual Grammy Awards in 1985, alongside their mother, where they performed "Hallelujah" as part of a medley with the year's fellow gospel nominees.

Denise's departure and subsequent projects (1986-1994)
In 1986, after a four-year gap between releases, the sisters Jacky, Twinkie, Dorinda, and Karen (sister Denise left the group earlier that year) continued to release music, signing with Rejoice Records, a division of Word. This new deal yielded the Grammy-nominated Heart & Soul, featuring the mainstream single "Time Out". This project made a top-five debut on Billboard's Gospel Charts and garnered the group a Dove Award. It featured the original versions of "Jesus Is a Love Song", "There Is a Balm in Gilead", and "Pray for the USA", all of which have been re-recorded several times. Although not pictured, Denise had contributed to the album before her departure but was later removed from the album. The music took on a more contemporary sound with programmed drums and synthesizers. Also included on this album were "Smile, God Loves You", "I Am Blessed", and the funky "He'll Turn Your Scars into Stars".

In 1988, The Clark Sisters released their Billboard chart-topping and critically acclaimed album Conqueror. It featured a bolder, more intense sound, with synthesizers, drum machines, and more funk-oriented beats. Conqueror quickly became a fan favorite with hits like "The Darkest Hour Is Just Before the Day", "Take Me Higher", "For the Love of the People", "Computers Rule the World", and the original studio version of "Jesus Forevermore".

In 1989, The Clark Sisters released their live album, Bringing It Back Home, recorded in their home town of Detroit. It was the last recording from The Clark Sisters on Word Records' Rejoice imprint and the last group album with Twinkie just before the launch of her solo career. The album included both previous hits and new material. It also featured guest appearances from Rance Allen and backing choir vocals from the Michigan State Choir under the direction of their mother, Dr. Mattie Moss Clark.

In 1994, The Clark Sisters (Jacky, Dorinda, and Karen) released their last studio album of the decade, Miracle, which was the first album recorded without the songwriting and vocals of sister Twinkie. Produced by BeBe Winans and Michael J. Powell, this disc featured a commercialized version of the Clark Sisters classic "Expect Your Miracle" (now titled "Miracle") and a remake of "Jesus Is the Best Thing". Dorinda made her songwriting debut on a Clark Sisters recording with "Work to Do". The album, although it fared well in sales, did not match the success of previous albums due to the Clark Sisters not being able to tour and promote the project due to the illness of their mother, Dr. Mattie Moss Clark, who died in September 1994 from diabetes complications.

Solo careers (1995-2006)
Following their last Word Records release, Twinkie resumed her calling as a minister and her solo career. She had previously released two solo albums under the Sound of Gospel Record label: 1979's Praise Belongs to God and 1981's Ye Shall Receive Power. In 1992 she recorded her independent solo album Comin' Home. She re-appeared in 1996 with a pair of albums to her credit: the solo studio release The Masterpiece for Ben Tankard's Tribute Records label and the live project Twinkie Clark-Terrell Presents the Florida A&M University Gospel Choir.  She later released the following albums: Twinkie Clark & Friends: Live in Charlotte in 2002, Home Once Again: Live in Detroit in 2004, With Humility in 2011, Live & Unplugged in 2015, and with her nephew Larry Clark (her sister Denise's oldest son) The Generations in 2020.

Karen delivered her solo debut Finally Karen in 1997. The album, featuring The Clark Sisters, Faith Evans, and daughter Kierra Sheard, was nominated for a Grammy Award, in addition to winning a Soul Train Lady of Soul Award. She has since released five more solo albums: 2nd Chance, The Heavens Are Telling, It's Not Over, All in One, and Destined to Win.

Dorinda released her self-titled debut solo album, Dorinda Clark-Cole in 2002, earning her two Stellar Awards, and a Soul Train Lady of Soul award. She has since released four more solo albums: Live in Houston and Take It Back, each of which have earned her the award for Female Vocalist of the Year at the Stellar Awards; I Survived in 2011, and in 2015, she released her fifth solo album, Living It, which was nominated for a Grammy Award for Best Gospel Album.

Jacky released her first solo project, Expectancy, in 2005, which features The Clark Sisters on the track "Blessing Me". In 2014, she released an urban-inspired single, "My Season", followed by singles "Cover Me" and "Shout". In February 2020, she released a single "Feel Good", featuring Mary J. Blige and rapper Tia P.

The Clark Sisters have all contributed in various capacities to each other's albums, whether they sang or wrote lyrics.

Live...One Last Time and Grammy recognition (2007-2009)
On July 8, 2006, The Clark Sisters (Jacky, Twinkie, Dorinda, and Karen) recorded a live album in Houston, Texas, entitled Live...One Last Time. The recording was directed and produced by Donald Lawrence and was released as a CD on April 10, 2007 on EMI Gospel, followed by a CD/DVD Special Edition release on June 19, 2007. In support of the reunion album, the Clark Sisters embarked on a 25-city concert tour beginning October 4, 2007 in Nashville, Tennessee. Though they had been thrice nominated previously for the Best Soul Gospel Performance by a Duo or Group Grammy with 1982's Sincerely, 1986's Heart & Soul, and 1988's Conqueror without a win, the group was nominated for two Grammys in 2008. Live...One Last Time won the award for Best Traditional Gospel Album. Its album track "Blessed & Highly Favored" won the award for Best Gospel Performance, and as songwriter of "Blessed & Highly Favored," sister Karen Clark Sheard won the individual award for Best Gospel Song. Additionally, at the 50th Annual Grammy Awards ceremony featuring a gospel segment with Aretha Franklin, BeBe Winans, Israel & New Breed, and Trin-i-tee 5:7, the Clark Sisters performed a snippet of their signature hit "You Brought the Sunshine" when the ceremony was broadcast on February 10 at the Staples Center in Los Angeles.

Following the group's resurgence in popularity, Rhino Entertainment released a greatest-hits collection including material from three albums recorded for Word Records from the mid-1980s through the early 1990s, including the Grammy-nominated Heart & Soul. The album, Encore: The Best of the Clark Sisters, was released on February 12, 2008. In December of that year, TV One's popular hour-long music documentary series Unsung featured the Clark Sisters in its second episode. The episode, which highlighted the group's role in breaking down barriers in gospel music, featured interviews with each sister except sister Denise Clark Bradford, who since leaving the group, had relocated to California and had begun a ministry.

In 2009, the Clark Sisters released their second Christmas album, entitled The Clark Sisters' Family Christmas, which featured special appearances by Karen's daughter Kierra Sheard, and their cousins Bill Moss, Jr. and James Moss (known as J. Moss). The album was produced by Karen's son, J. Drew Sheard, II.

Lifetime movie and The Return (2018-present)
On November 11, 2018, it was reported that The Clark Sisters would have a television biopic, The Clark Sisters: First Ladies of Gospel. The film aired on Lifetime on April 11, 2020, and netted a viewership of 2.7 million, giving the network its highest rated original movie in four years. The film was executive produced by Queen Latifah, Missy Elliott, and Mary J. Blige, and starred Aunjanue Ellis as Dr. Mattie Moss Clark, Angela Birchett as Jacky Clark Chisholm, Raven Goodwin as Denise Clark Bradford, Christina Bell as Twinkie Clark, Sheléa Frazier as Dorinda Clark Cole, and Kierra Sheard as her mother, Karen Clark Sheard. The movie was directed by Christine Swanson, the story was by Camille Tucker, with a teleplay by Sylvia L. Jones and Camille Tucker.

On October 18, 2019, the Clark Sisters debuted their new single "Victory" on Erica Campbell's radio show Get Up Erica. The single was later released on November 15, 2019, through Karew/Motown Gospel/Capitol CMG On March 13, 2020, the Clark Sisters released their seventeenth album, The Return. Their first release in over a decade, it featured production from J. Drew Sheard, II, Warryn Campell, Rodney Jerkins, Jermaine Dupri, Mano Hines, and Kurt Carr, with a special feature by Snoop Dogg on the track, "His Love".

Artistry

"The Clark Sound"
Since early in the group's development, Twinkie has been the chief songwriter, vocal arranger, and producer for the group. The Clark Sisters as a whole are renowned for their group style, dubbed as "the Clark Sound". They incorporate high and fast melismas, acrobatic trills and riffs, and deep, soulful growls or "squalls". While they have been praised for their precise harmonies, The Clark Sisters are also known for their individual, distinctive vocal styles, and while there is no single lead vocalist in the group, each sister has led a handful of songs over the years.

The Clark Sisters have cited Aretha Franklin, who also grew up in Detroit, as a major musical influence. When Franklin died of pancreatic cancer in 2018, the Clark Sisters sang one of their signature songs, "Is My Living in Vain", at her service.

Group timeline and structure

Influence and covers
The Clark Sisters are credited as vocal inspirations to Faith Evans, Beyonce, Kelly Price, Missy Elliott, Mary Mary, Queen Latifah, Kelly Rowland, Mary J. Blige, Yebba and Mariah Carey. Their musical influence has been celebrated through covers and interpolations from both religious and secular artists alike.

Discography

Studio albums

Live albums

Compilation albums

Singles

As lead artist

As a featured artist

Other charted songs

Other appearances

Awards

BET Awards

The BET Awards are awarded annually by the Black Entertainment Television network. The Clark Sisters have received 2 nominations.

Dove Awards

The Dove Awards are awarded annually by the Gospel Music Association. The Clark Sisters have won 2 awards from 8 nominations.

Grammy Awards

The Grammy Awards are awarded annually by the National Academy of Recording Arts and Sciences. The Clark Sisters have won 2 awards from 7 nominations.

NAACP Image Awards

The NAACP Image Awards are awarded annually by the National Association for the Advancement of Colored People (NAACP). The Clark Sisters have won 2 awards from 4 nominations.

Soul Train Awards
The Soul Train Music Awards are awarded annually. The Clark Sisters have received 3 nominations.

Stellar Awards
The Stellar Awards are awarded annually by SAGMA. The Clark Sisters have received 8 awards and 1 honorary award.

References

External links
 
 Clark Sisters Official Myspace Page
 The Clark Sisters Official Message Board
 Clark Sisters Marathon on Myspace
 Clark Sisters Internet Radio Station on Live365
 Stellar Awards
 Clark Sisters: Live, One Last Time (Release Alert on BlackGospel.com)

Grammy Award winners
American gospel musical groups
Singers from Detroit
American gospel singers
Sibling quartets
African-American musical groups
Musical groups from Detroit
African-American Christians
American Pentecostals
Members of the Church of God in Christ
American girl groups
Musical groups established in 1966
1966 establishments in Michigan
African-American women musicians